The Kunstforum Salzkammergut is an Austrian art association in the Salzkammergut region, based in Gmunden, whose members deal with various art forms. Originally founded in 1928, the Salzkammergut Artists' Guild changed its name to Kunstforum Salzkammergut in 2008. The association runs its own gallery in Gmunden and organises exhibitions, cooperations with other institutions, publications, readings, concerts and other events for the associated artists, in particular also in the Kammerhofgalerie in the Kammerhofmuseum in Gmunden. The artists' association repeatedly participates in the Linz Art Fair.

Direction 
The new leadership elected in 2014 is a team consisting of Ferdinand Reisenbichler, Ottilie Großmayer and Heidi Zednik as well as the advisory board members Paul Jaeg and Konrad Wallinger.

Publications 
 50 Jahre Künstlergilde Salzkammergut. 2 parts. Gmunden 1978, .
 Hedwig Schraml: Die Keramik, Ausstellung in der Kammerhofgalerie 2008 anlässlich des 80jährigen Bestehens der Künstlergilde Salzkammergut (1928 bis 2008) im Rahmen der Oberösterreichischen Landesausstellung, Salzkammergut. Bibliothek der Provinz, Weitra 2008, .
 Kunst im Salzkammergut. Mehrteiliges Werk (Alte Meister, Geometrie +Konzept, Der Traunseher und die Bildmanufaktur Traunsee, Die Keramik, Landschaftsbilder - Bildlandschaften). 2008–2009.

References

Further reading 
 Franz Schicker: 25 Jahre Künstlergilde Salzkammergut, Gmunden, Jubiläumsausstellung, Linz 24. Juni bis 22. Juli 1953 und Gmunden 27. Juli bis 24. August 1953. Gmunden 1953.

External links 
 Bibliografie zur oberösterreichischen Geschichte on OoeGeschichte
 
 .
 Kunstforum Salzkammergut. In Webpräsenz von basis-wien.at.
 Künstlergilde Salzkammergut. In Webpräsenz von basis-wien.at.

Gmunden
Cultural organisations based in Austria
1928 establishments in Austria
Austrian artist groups and collectives